Hydrangea macrophylla is a species of flowering plant in the family Hydrangeaceae, native to Japan. Common names include bigleaf hydrangea, French hydrangea, lacecap hydrangea, mophead hydrangea, penny mac and hortensia. It is widely cultivated in many parts of the world in many climates. It is not to be confused with H. aspera 'Macrophylla'.

Description 

The term macrophylla means large- or long-leaved. They are simple, membranous, orbicular to elliptic and acuminate. They are generally serrated.

The inflorescence of Hydrangea macrophylla is a corymb, with all flowers placed in a plane or hemisphere, or even a whole sphere in cultivated forms. Two distinct types of flowers can be identified: central, non-ornamental, pentamerous ones, and peripheral, ornamental, tetramerous ones. The latter have sterile pistils with fertile stamen. The four sepals of decorative flowers have colors ranging from pale pink to red fuchsia purple to blue. The non-decorative flowers have five small greenish sepals and five small petals. Flowering begins in early summer and lasts until early winter. The fruit is a subglobose capsule.

Distribution and habitat 
Hydrangea macrophylla is native to East Asia. It is reported from seaside habitats as well as mountains in Japan, from Honshu southwards. This species has naturalized in China, Korea, Siberia, New Zealand and the Americas. It is an invasive species in the Azores and Madeira archipelagos.

Colors and soil acidity 
Hydrangea macrophylla blooms can be blue, red, pink, light purple, or dark purple. The color is affected by soil pH. An acidic soil (pH below 7) will usually produce flower color closer to blue, whereas an alkaline soil (pH above 7) will produce flowers more pink.This is caused by a color change of the flower pigments in the presence of aluminium ions which can be taken up into hyperaccumulating plants.

Landscaping 
In climates where Hydrangea macrophylla flowers, place in a mixed shrub border or at the back of a flower bed. Its rich foliage and large size make it a wonderful background for white or light colored flowers, even tall growing perennials and annuals. In warm climates H. macrophylla is good for adding a splash of early summer color to shady areas and woodland gardens. Minimal pruning is recommended for most prolific flowering. Flowers are easily air dried and are long lasting.

While Hydrangea macrophylla is not considered a particularly difficult plant to grow, it may fail to flower. This may be due to cold winter damage to the flower buds, not getting enough sunlight, too much nitrogen fertilizer, or pruning at the wrong time of year.
H. macrophylla forms flower buds in late summer.  As a result, pruning in late summer, fall or winter could remove potential flowers.

Chemistry 
Phyllodulcin, hydrangenol, and their 8-O-glucosides, and thunberginols A and F can be found in H. macrophylla. Thunberginol B, the dihydroisocoumarins thunberginol C, D and E, the dihydroisocoumarin glycosides thunberginol G 3'-O-glucoside and (−)-hydrangenol 4'-O-glucoside and four kaempferol and quercetin oligoglycosides can be found in Hydrangeae Dulcis Folium, the processed leaves of H. macrophylla var. thunbergii. The leaves also contain the stilbenoid hydrangeic acid.

The various colors, such as red, mauve, purple, violet and blue, in H. macrophylla are developed from one simple anthocyanin, delphinidin 3-glucoside (myrtillin), which forms complexes with metal ions called metalloanthocyanins.

Lunularic acid, lunularin, 3,4′-dihydroxystilbene and a glycoside of lunularic acid have been found in the roots of H. macrophylla.

Hydrangine is another name for the coumarin umbelliferone, and may be responsible for the possible toxicity of the plant.

Possible uses 
 
Amacha is a Japanese beverage made from fermented leaves of Hydrangea macrophylla var. thunbergii.

Hydrangeae Dulcis Folium is a drug made from the fermented and dried leaves of H. macrophylla var. thunbergii with possible antiallergic and antimicrobial properties. It also has a hepatoprotective activity by suppression of D-galactosamine-induced liver injury in vitro and in vivo.

Hydrangea macrophylla is included in the Tasmanian Fire Service's list of low flammability plants, indicating that it is suitable for growing within a building protection zone.

Leaf extracts of Hydrangea macrophylla are being investigated as a possible source of new chemical compounds with antimalarial activity.  Hydrangeic acid from the leaves is being investigated as a possible anti-diabetic drug as it significantly lowered blood glucose, triglyceride, and free fatty acid levels in laboratory animals.

Cultivars 
The two main types of  H. macrophylla cultivars  are called "mophead" and "lacecap".

Some popular hydrangea cultivars (those marked  have gained the Royal Horticultural Society's Award of Garden Merit) include: 
 
'All Summer Beauty'; cold-hardy, floriferous mophead
'Alpengluhen'; deep-red colored mophead
'Altona' ; compact plant with large rose-red florets
'Ami Pasquier' ; floriferous, wine pink to blue mophead
'Ayesha'; small, cupped, lilac-like flowers in clusters
'Bailmer' (marketed as Endless Summer) a perpetual-blooming, pink to blue mophead
'Beauté Vendômoise'; giant whitish-pink lacecap
'Blaumeise' ; Swiss-bred "Teller" blue lacecap
'Blue Bonnet'; hardy, blue mophead
'Blue Wave'; robust light pink to light blue lacecap
'Blushing Bride'; cold-hardy, ever-blooming white mophead
'Cocktail'; bushy shrub with ovate, serrated sepals
'Europa' ; compact, deep pink mophead
'Forever Pink'; a pink mophead
'Générale Vicomtesse de Vibraye' ; compact, cold-hardy, French-bred pink to blue mophead
'Hamburg'; deep-colored pink to blue mophead
'Harlequin'; a picoteed pink to purple mophead
'Lady in Red'; large lacecap flowers of rose-red
'Lanarth White' ; white lacecap
'Lilacina'; cold-hardy, disease-resistant pink to blue lacecap
'Love You Kiss' ; red-margined white florets, lacecap
'Marechal Foch'; old-fashioned pink to blue mophead
'Mariesii Grandiflora'; blue or pink and white lacecap
'Mariesii Lilacina' ; mauve pink or blue lacecap
'Mariesii Perfecta'; blue, or blue and pink, lacecap
'Masja'; bushy and compact, dark pink to pink mophead
'Möwe'; rose-red and cream lacecap
'Nigra'; pink or blue mophead, black stems
'Nikko Blue'; popular, cold-hardy pink to blue mophead
'Pia'; dwarf pink to purplish-blue mophead
'Penny Mac'; cold-hardy, pink to blue mophead
'Rotschwantz’ ; deep red and white lacecap
'Soeur Therese'; hardy, robust white mophead
'Taube'; Swiss-bred "Teller", pink to blue lacecap
'Tokyo Delight' ; mauve-pink and white lacecap
'Twist-N-Shout'; ever-blooming, hardy pink to blue lacecap
'Veitchii' ; blue and white lacecap
'Westfalen' ; compact, crimson-purple mophead
'Zorro’ ;  bright blue lacecap

Gallery

References

External links

 - Splendor In The Grass
 Hydrangeas- Their Pruning and Care(Heronswood Nursery)
 http://www.HydrangeasHydrangeas.com/mopheads.html - All About Hydrangeas: Information on Hydrangea macrophylla.
 http://www.floridata.com/ref/h/hydran_m.cfm
 http://www.clemson.edu/extension/hgic/plants/landscape/shrubs/hgic1067.html
 Hydrangea Thoughts I - Informative but non-scholarly essay on Hydrangea (Culture, History and Etymology).

macrophylla
Endemic flora of Japan
Garden plants of Asia
Poisonous plants